Line infantry was the type of infantry that composed the basis of European land armies from the late 17th century to the mid-19th century. Maurice of Nassau and Gustavus Adolphus are generally regarded as its pioneers, while Turenne and Montecuccoli are closely associated with the post-1648 development of linear infantry tactics. For both battle and parade drill, it consisted of two to four ranks of foot soldiers drawn up side by side in rigid alignment, and thereby maximizing the effect of their firepower. By extension, the term came to be applied to the regular regiments "of the line" as opposed to light infantry, skirmishers, militia, support personnel, plus some other special categories of infantry not focused on heavy front line combat.

Linear tactics and function 
Line infantry mainly used three formations in its battles: the line, the square and the column.

With the massive proliferation of small arms (firearms that could be carried by hand, as opposed to cannon) in the infantry units from the middle of 17th century, the battlefield was dominated by linear tactics, according to which the infantry was aligned into long thin lines and fired volleys. A line consisted of 2, 3 or 4 ranks of soldiers.

The soldiers were supposed to fire volleys at the command of officers, but in practice this happened only in the first minutes of the battle. After one or two volleys, each soldier charged a musket and fired at his own discretion, without hearing the commands of the officers. This brought confusion to the system, and the smoke interfered with accurate shooting. Such a shootout in a puff of smoke could occur for a very long period of time and the result was unpredictable. In addition, at the time of the “hot” shootout, the soldiers were so busy and focused on shooting that they could not notice the attack of cavalry from the flank. Therefore, experienced troops tried to avoid such costly shootouts and restrained their soldiers from premature firing, in order to get as close to the enemy’s line as possible to deliver several crushing volleys at a short distance. In some cases, it was possible to overturn the enemy with just one volley at a short distance. 
The line was considered the fundamental battle formation as it allowed for the largest deployment of firepower. Troops in skirmish formation, though able to take cover and use initiative, were highly vulnerable to cavalry and could not hold ground against advancing infantry columns. Line infantry provided an 'anchor' for skirmishers and cavalry to retreat behind if threatened.

Against surrounding enemy cavalry, line infantry could swiftly adopt square formations to provide protection. Such squares were hollow (consisting of four lines), unlike the pikemen's and old-style musketeers' square.

Movement in line formation was very slow, and unless the battalion was superbly trained, a breakdown in cohesion was virtually assured, especially in any kind of uneven or wooded terrain. As a result, line was mostly used as a stationary formation, with troops moving in column formations and then deploying to line at their destination. Usually, columns would be adopted for movement and melee attacks.

Line infantry was trained in the manual of arms evolutions, the main objectives of which were fast deployment of a line, rapid shooting and manoeuvre.

Training and recruitment 
Line tactics required a strict discipline and simple movements, practiced to the point where they became second-nature. During training, the drill and corporal punishments were widely used.

Line infantry quickly became the most common type of infantry in European countries. Musketeers and grenadiers, formerly elite troops, gradually became part of the line infantry, switching to linear tactics.

Over time the use of line infantry tactics spread outside of Europe, often as a result of European imperialism. In European colonies and settlements with small populations from the home country, line infantry forces were often raised from the local population, with the British East India Company's sepoys perhaps being the most historically significant example.

During 1814, in the War of the Sixth Coalition, the training of regular French line infantry recruits was very limited due to the fierce attack of the Coalition Forces. A recruit was trained by firing two cartridges and four blanks. There was also light training of forming several formations. By these examples, forming a massive extent of well trained, elite line infantry was a very complicated process.

Arms and equipment 
In the middle of the 16th century, the matchlock muskets of some line infantry were equipped with bayonets. Bayonets were attached to the muzzles of muskets and were used when line troops entered melee combat. They also helped to defend against cavalry.

At the end of the 17th century, a flaw within the design of matchlock muskets became more apparent. Since the matchlock musket used a slow burning piece of twine known as a slow match, the twine sometimes would accidentally set fire to the gunpowder reservoir in the musket prematurely setting off all of the gunpowder and bringing serious injury and death to the operator. During this time, matchlock muskets began to be replaced by lighter and cheaper infantry fusils with flintlocks, weighing 5 kg with a caliber of 17.5 mm, first in France and then in other countries. In many countries, the new fusils retained the name "musket". Both muskets and fusils were smoothbore, which lessened their accuracy and range, but made for faster loading, lesser amount of bore fouling and more robust, less complicated firearms.

The accuracy of smooth-bore muskets was in the range of 300-400 yards against a line of infantry or cavalry. Against a single enemy, however, the effective range was no more than 50-100 yards. It should be borne in mind that ordinary linear infantrymen were poorly trained in aimed shooting, due to the saving of gunpowder and lead (modern reenactors achieve much better results by firing smooth-bore muskets). Line infantrymen were trained in rapidly reloading their muskets. The recruit was expected to load 3 rounds a minute, while an experienced soldier could load between 4 to 6 rounds per minute. In battle conditions, this number was reduced and after the first few minutes of combat, no more than 2 rounds per minute could be expected even from well trained troops.

The bulk of the line infantry had no protective equipment, as armor that could provide protection from musket fire were considered too expensive and heavy. Only the former elite troops could keep by tradition some elements of protection, for example, the copper mitre caps of grenadiers.

Line infantry and other contemporary types of infantry 
Initially, soldiers equipped with firearms formed only a small part of the infantry branch of most armies, because of their vulnerability to hostile cavalry. Pikemen formed the majority of infantrymen and were known as heavy infantry. A significant part of infantry consisted of old-style musketeers, who did not use the linear tactics, instead skirmishing in open formation. However, by the middle of the 17th century, musketeers deployed in line formation already provided about half of the foot troops in most Western European armies. Maurice of Nassau was noted as the first large scale user of linear tactic in Europe, introducing the 'counter-march' to enable his formations of musketeers to maintain a continuous fire. After the invention of the bayonet, musketeers could finally defend themselves from the enemy's horsemen, and the percentage of pikemen fell gradually. In 1699, the Austrian army got rid of their pikes. In 1703, the French army did the same, in 1704 the British and 1708 the Dutch. In 1699–1721, Peter I converted almost all Russian foot-regiments to line infantry. The abandonment of the pike, together with the faster firing rate made possible by the introduction of the new flintlock musket and paper cartridge, resulted in the abandonment of the deeper formations of troops more ideal for the melee-oriented pikemen. Instead, military thinking switched to shallower lines that maximized the firepower of an infantry formation.

Besides regular line infantry, there were elite troops (royal guards and other designated elite regiments) and the light infantry. Light infantry operated in extended order (also known as skirmish formation) as opposed to the close order (tight formations) used by line infantry. Since the late 18th century, light infantry in most European countries mostly consisted of riflemen (such as the German Jäger), armed with rifled carbines and trained in aimed shooting and use of defilades.

In England, much of the light infantry was armed with smooth-bore muskets, only a few regiments used rifled muskets.

In France, during the Revolutionary and Napoleonic Wars, the division into the Guard, while line infantry and light infantry formally continued to exist, line and "light" regiments had identical weaponry (smooth-bore fusils) and tactics. (Napoleon preferred smooth-bore weaponry for their faster reload speeds.) However, each battalion in both line and "light" regiments included a company of voltigeurs, who were expected to act as skirmishers as well being able to deploy into line.

In the Russian Empire, light infantry was forming at a very fast pace; by the end of the 18th century, regiments of light infantry totaled 40,000 soldiers (Jaeger). The armament of light infantry was very different from the armament of linear infantry. They were armed with high-quality muskets, as well as pistols (for close combat). After the unsuccessful army reforms of Paul I, the number of light infantry in the Russian army was significantly reduced and made up only 8% of the entire field infantry. But soon the Russian army returned to the trend of increasing the number of light infantry, begun in the 18th century. By 1811, 50 light infantry regiments were formed in the Russian army. In addition, in each linear battalion it was required to have 100 of the best shooting soldiers who fought in a loose ranks and covered their battalions from the enemy skirmishers. The total number of light infantry reached 40% of the entire field infantry. Unfortunately, the sharp increase in the number of light infantry greatly influenced their quality of training and equipment. The Russian infantry of 1854 comprised 108 regiments, of which 42 were line infantry. The remainder were specialized or elite units such as Guards, Grenadiers and Jägers. Only part of the Russian light infantry were equipped with the M1854 rifle, the remainder retaining smoothbore percussion muskets.

In the second half of the 19th century, the coming of mass production and new technologies, such as the Minie ball, allowed European armies to gradually equip all their infantrymen with rifled weapons, and the percentage of line infantry equipped with muskets fell. In the American Civil War, both Northern and Confederate armies had only a few line regiments equipped with the old-style smooth-bore muskets. However, France, due to Napoleon III, who admired Napoleon I, had 300 line battalions (comprising an overwhelming majority) even in 1870. Although the French line infantry received Chassepot rifles in 1866, it was still being trained in the use of close formations (line, column and square), which was changed only after the dethronement of Napoleon III. This was common practice in all conventional Western armies until the late 19th century, as infantry tactics and military thinking had yet to catch up with the new technological development.

Decline 
In the years after the Napoleonic Wars, line infantry continued to be deployed as the main battle force, while light infantry provided fire support and covered the movement of units. In Russia, Great Britain, France, Prussia and some other states, linear tactics and formation discipline were maintained into the late 19th century.

With the invention of new weaponry, the concept of line infantry began to wane. The Minié ball, an improved rifle ammunition, allowed individual infantrymen to shoot more accurately and over greatly increased range. Men walking in formation line-abreast became easy targets, as evidenced in the American Civil War. The Austro-Prussian War in 1866 showed that breech-loading rifles, which gave the individual shooter a greatly increased rate of fire as well as the capability to reload from a prone position, were greatly superior to muzzle loaded rifles. In the 1860s, most German states and Russia converted their line infantry and riflemen into 'united' infantry, which used rifles and skirmish tactics. After the Franco-Prussian War, both the German Empire and the French Third Republic did the same. However, Great Britain retained the name "line infantry", although it used rifled muskets from 1853 and breech loading rifles from 1867, and switched from closed lines to extended order during the Boer wars.

The growing accuracy and rate of fire of rifles, together with the invention of the Maxim machine gun in 1883, meant that close order line infantry would suffer huge losses before being able to close with their foe, while the defensive advantages given to line infantry against cavalry became irrelevant with the effective removal of offensive cavalry from the battlefield in the face of the improved weaponry. With the turn of the 20th century, this slowly led to infantry increasingly adopting skirmish style light infantry tactics in battle, while retaining line infantry drill for training.

Retention of "line infantry" title 
While, as detailed above, linear battle tactics had become obsolete by the second half of the nineteenth century, regiments in a number of European armies continued to be classified as "line infantry" (or cavalry). This designation had come to mean the regular or numbered regiments of an army, as opposed to specialist or elite formations. Accordingly, the distinction had become one of traditional title or classification without significance in respect of armament or tactics. As an example, the 
Belgian Army of 1914 comprised 14 regiments of Infanterie de Ligne (line infantry), three of Chasseurs a pied (light infantry), one of Grenadiers and one of Carabiniers. Similar differentiations were made in the majority of European armies of the period, although English-speaking authors sometimes use the designation "line infantry" when referring to the ordinary infantry of some other countries where the exact term was not in use.

The term was also used by US units during the Second World War, as shown by this quote from a report of the 782nd Tank Battalion in late April 1945:

On the 22nd of April, the Battalion moved from Oberkotzau, Germany to Wunsiedel, Germany. Here the attachment of the line companies to the Regimental Combat Teams of the 97th Division was completed. We separated, not coming together again until the war was over. Company "A" joined the 303rd at Rehau, Germany: Company "B" joined the 386th at Arzburg, Germany: and Company "C" the 387th at Waldsassen, Germany.

The modern British Army retains the traditional distinction between "Guards", "Line Infantry" and "the Rifles" on ceremonial occasions for historical reasons. It is linked to the order of precedence within the British Army and regimental pride, so for example Colonel Patrick Crowley states in the "introduction" in A Brief History of The Princess of Wales’s Royal Regiment (2015):

Infantry of most 21st-century armies are still trained in formation manoeuvre and drill, as a way of instilling discipline and unit cohesion. Members of the US Army utilize the term "line company" (informally) in light infantry battalions to differentiate those companies (generally A–D) that perform the traditional infantry role from the support companies (generally F and HHC) charged with supporting the "line companies". The Marine Corps does the same for all its infantry units. In this vein, officers assigned to the rifle companies are referred to as "line officers" while billeted to positions such as Platoon Leaders and Commanding and Executive Officers.

See also 
 Fusilier
 Grenadier
 Line regiment

References 

Infantry
Military units and formations of the Early Modern period
18th- and 19th-century warrior types
16th- and 17th-century warrior types
Obsolete occupations
Warriors
Combat occupations